Lars Olof Jonathan Söderblom (15 January 1866 – 12 July 1931) was a Swedish clergyman. He was the Church of Sweden Archbishop of Uppsala between 1914 and 1931, and recipient of the 1930 Nobel Peace Prize. He is commemorated in the Calendar of Saints of the Lutheran Church on 12 July.

Biography
Söderblom was born in the village of Trönö in Söderhamn Municipality, Gävleborg County. His father was a parish priest. He enrolled at Uppsala University in 1883. Although not initially convinced what he wanted to study, he eventually decided to follow in his father's footsteps. On returning from a journey to the U.S., he was ordained priest in 1893. During the years 1892 and 1893, Söderblom was first vice president and then president of the Uppsala Student Union.

From 1894 until 1901, he held a ministry at the Swedish Embassy in Paris, where his congregation included both Alfred Nobel (1833–1896) and August Strindberg (1849–1912). In 1897, he conducted the memorial service following the death of Alfred Nobel. From 1901 to 1914, Söderblom held a chair in the School of Theology at Uppsala University and from 1912 to 1914 was also a professor of Religious studies at Leipzig University. In 1914, he was elected as Archbishop of Uppsala, the head of the Lutheran church in Sweden. During the First World War, he called on all Christian leaders to work for peace and justice while working to alleviate the conditions of prisoners of war and refugees.

He believed that church unity had the specific purpose of presenting the gospel to the world and that the messages of Jesus were relevant to social life. His leadership of the Christian "Life and Work" movement in the 1920s has led him to be recognised as one of the principal founders of the ecumenical movement. He had begun the movement toward intercommunion between the Church of Sweden and the Church of England and was a close associate of the English ecumenist George Bell (1883–1958), Dean of Canterbury, Bishop of Chichester. He was instrumental in chairing the World Conference of Life and Work in Stockholm, in 1925. In 1930 he was awarded the Nobel Peace Prize.

Selected works
Den enskilde och kyrkan : föredrag (1909)
Helighet och kultur (1913)
Gudstrons uppkomst (1914)
  9 Works by Nathan Söderblom at The Documentation of Chinese Christianity program, Hong Kong Baptist University Library

See also

World Council of Churches
Ecumenism

References

Other sources
Andrae, Tor J.E. (1931) Nathan Söderblom (Uppsala University)
Curtis, Charles J. (1967) Söderblom: Ecumenical Pioneer (Minneapolis, Augsburg Publishing House)
Jonson, Jonas (2016) Nathan Söderblom: Called to Serve (Grand Rapids: Eerdmans Publishing Company) 
Katz, Peter (1949) Nathan Söderblom: A Prophet of Christian Unity (London, James Clarke) 
Sundkler, Beng (1968) Nathan Söderblom: His Life and Work (Lutterworth Press)

Further reading 
Dietz Lange, Nathan Söderblom und seine Zeit, Göttingen 2011
Klas Hansson, Nathan Söderblom's ecumenical cope. A visualization of a theological and ecumenical concept. Studia Theologica – Nordic Journal of Theology, vol 66, issue 1, 2012

External links
 
 The Content of Christian Faith, a reflection by Nathan Söderblom
 
 

1866 births
1931 deaths
People from Söderhamn Municipality
Uppsala University alumni
Academic staff of Leipzig University
Lutheran archbishops of Uppsala
20th-century Lutheran archbishops
Swedish historians of religion
Members of the Swedish Academy
Nobel Peace Prize laureates
Swedish Nobel laureates
People celebrated in the Lutheran liturgical calendar
Burials at Uppsala Cathedral
People in Christian ecumenism